The Gemma Claudia is a Roman five-layered onyx cameo of c. 49 AD.  It later found its way into the Habsburg collections now in the Kunsthistorisches Museum, Vienna (AS Inv. No. IX A 63).  It is 12 cm high and set in a gold rim.

It depicts two cornucopia (with an eagle between), out of which sprout four portraits, two on either side. On the left is the Emperor Claudius and his new wife Agrippina the Younger (as Cybele, the goddess of fertility) opposite them, Agrippina's parents Germanicus (also Claudius's brother) and Agrippina the Elder. Its 49 AD date places it soon after Claudius married Agrippina in January 49, and makes it possible that it was an official marriage gift to the imperial couple. 

The unknown artist carved the work from the five alternately dark and light layers of the stone with great virtuosity. They achieved an increased transparency of the material by cutting layers that in places are of unparalleled thinness (minimum 2 mm).

External links 

Kunsthistorisches Museum | Gemma Claudia
Gemma Claudia on the homepage of gemmarius-sculptor

Julio-Claudian dynasty
Roman Empire cameos
Classical antiquities of the Kunsthistorisches Museum
Archaeological discoveries in Italy